Mộng-Lan is a Vietnamese-born American writer, visual artist, musician, dancer, and educator. Former Stegner Fellow at Stanford University, Fulbright Scholar, she has published seven books of poetry & artwork, three chapbooks, has won numerous prizes such as the Juniper Prize and the Pushcart Prize. Poems have been included in international and national anthologies such as Best American Poetry Anthology and several Norton anthologies. Her books include: Song of the Cicadas (Juniper Prize Winner); Why is the Edge Always Windy?; Tango, Tangoing: poems & art; One Thousand Minds Brimming, 2016; and Dusk Aflame: poems & art, 2018. Her latest music album releases include Arrabal de Tango: Tango por Siempre, voice & guitar, 2020; Perfumas de Amor, de Argentina y Viet Nam, (Tango por Siempre) (voice and guitar), 2018; New Orleans of My Heart, jazz piano, 2019; Dreaming Orchid: Poetry & Jazz Piano, 2016.  www.monglan.com

Life

Born in Saigon, South Vietnam, Mong-Lan left her native Vietnam on the last day of evacuation of Saigon.  Former Stegner Fellow at Stanford University, Fulbright Scholar, she has published seven books of poetry & artwork, three chapbooks, has won prizes such as the Juniper Prize and the Pushcart Prize. Poems have been included in numerous anthologies such as Best American Poetry Anthology, several Norton Anthologies, and The Pushcart Book of Poetry: Best Poems from 30 Years of the Pushcart Prize. She has finished a novel, with an excerpt in the North American Review. While having grown up and educated in the United States, she lived for five-six years in Japan (teaching as a professor with the Univ. of Maryland), and has lived numerous years in Argentina.

As a visual artist, Mong-Lan has had her paintings and photographs exhibited in museums such as the Dallas Museum of Art and galleries in the U.S., and in public exhibitions in Tokyo, Seoul, Bangkok, Bali and Buenos Aires.

As a musician, Mong-Lan plays the piano and guitar, sings in six languages, and also composes and writes songs. Her ten albums of jazz piano and tangos also showcase her poetry.

Mong-Lan as a dancer has studied ballet, jazz and flamenco, and has specialized as a tango dancer, performer, and teacher, having nearly twenty-five years of tango dance experience, in Buenos Aires, San Francisco, New York City, Tokyo, Bangkok, Hanoi, and elsewhere. Her one-woman musical show, "Ocean of Senses: Dream Songs & Tangos," blends original poetry, jazz piano, guitar, dance, story and song.

Career

Of her poetry, Robert Creeley has commented, "Mông-Lan is a remarkably accomplished poet. Always her poems are deft, extremely graceful in the way words move, and in the cadence that carries them. One is moved by the articulate character of 'things seen,' the subtle shifting of images, and the quiet intensity of their information. Clearly she is a master of the art."

Winner of a Pushcart Prize, the Juniper Prize, the Great Lakes Colleges Association's New Writers Awards for Poetry, Mong-Lan's poetry has been nationally and internationally anthologized to include being in Best American Poetry and The Pushcart Book of Poetry: Best Poems from 30 Years of the Pushcart Prize.  Author of eight books and chapbooks, Mộng-Lan's books include Song of the Cicadas; Why is the Edge Always Windy?, Tango, Tangoing: Poems & Art; the bilingual Spanish-English edition, Tango, Tangueando: Poemas & Dibujos; Love Poem to Tofu & Other Poems (poetry & calligraphic art, chapbook); Love Poem to Ginger & Other Poems: poetry & paintings (chapbook);  Force of the Heart: Tango, Art; One Thousand Minds Brimming: Poems & Art; and her most recent Dusk Aflame: poems & art.

Mong-Lan received her Master of Fine Arts degree from the University of Arizona, was the recipient of a Wallace E. Stegner Fellowship in poetry for two years at Stanford University, and was a Fulbright Fellow in Vietnam.  In addition to being anthologized in Best American Poetry and the Pushcart Prize Anthology her poetry has been included in Asian American Poetry: the Next Generation; Language for a New Century: Contemporary Poetry from the Middle East, Asia, and Beyond (Norton); Making More Waves: New Writing by Asian American Women;Force Majeure (Indonesia); Black Dog, Black Night: Contemporary Vietnamese Poetry; Jungle Crows: a Tokyo Expatriate anthology, and has appeared in numerous leading American literary journals such as The Kenyon Review, The Antioch Review, and the North American Review.

Her paintings and photographs have been exhibited for one year in the Capitol House in Washington D.C., for six months at the Dallas Museum of Art, the Museum of Fine Arts in Houston, in galleries in the San Francisco Bay Area, and in public exhibitions in Tokyo, Seoul, Bangkok, Buenos Aires, and Bali.  In conjunction with the National Endowment for the Arts, she was the Dallas Museum of Fine Arts' inaugural Visual Artist and Poet in Residence in 2005. An exhibition of her paintings and photographs, "The World of Mong-Lan," ran for six months.

Mong-Lan has read her poetry, given lectures, performances, and presented her artworks at many universities and festivals/workshops in a number of countries to include Buenos Aires, Argentina; the World Poetry Festival in Heidelberg, Germany; Lavigny, Switzerland; Fukuoka, Nagoya, and Tokyo, Japan; and in the U.S. to include:  Harvard University, Stanford University, San Francisco State University, University of Nevada, University of New Orleans, VA Festival of the Book, University of Maryland University College, SUNY Purchase, Kenyon College, DePauw University, Hope College, the Asia Society in NYC, Asian American Writers' Workshop and the Poetry Society of America's Festival for New Poets.

Mong-Lan as a musician, singer and composer, has released ten CDs, which range from jazz piano, spoken-word poetry, and singing and playing tangos on the guitar, CDs which also showcase her poetry. She has performed at universities, cultural organizations, clubs and cabarets.

Mong-Lan has taught at the University of Arizona, Stanford University, the Dallas Museum of Art, the San Diego State University Writers' Conference and in the Asian Division of the University of Maryland University College in Tokyo, Japan; and at the Jung Center of Houston, where she conducts multi-disciplinary workshops in writing, dance, music and the visual arts.

Books 
Song of the Cicadas (2001, Juniper Prize, UMASS Press)
Why is the Edge Always Windy? (2005, Tupelo Press)
Love Poem to Tofu & Other Poems (2007, chapbook of poetry & artwork, Valiant Press)
Tango, Tangoing: Poems & Art (2008)
Tango, Tangueando: Poemas & Dibujos (2009, Spanish-English bilingual edition)
Force of the Heart: Tango, Art
Love Poem to Ginger & Other Poems (2012, chapbook of poetry & artwork)
One Thousand Minds Brimming: Poems & Art (2014)
Dusk Aflame: poems & art (2018, Valiant Press)
Tone of Water in a Half-Filled Glass (2018, Foothills Publishing)

Honors
Juniper Prize, for Song of the Cicadas
Great Lakes Colleges Association's New Writers Awards for Poetry, for Song of the Cicadas
Poetry Society of America's Norma Farber First Book Award, Finalist, for Song of the Cicadas
Pushcart Prize, inclusion in Pushcart Book of Poetry: Best Poems from 30 Years of the Pushcart Prize, 2006.
Inaugural Visual Artist and Poet in Resident at the Dallas Museum of Art, through a National Endowment for the Arts Grant.
Fulbright Fellow to Vietnam
Wallace E. Stegner Fellow in Poetry at Stanford University for two years, 2000-2002. 
Inclusion in Best American Poetry Anthology, 2003
Le Chateau de Lavigny International Writer’s Residency, Lavigny, Switzerland, summer, 2000. 
Dr. Muriel Pollia Summer Fellowship in Poetry, Stanford University, 2001.
Dean's Master of Fine Arts Fellowship, Graduate College, Univ of Arizona 1999-2000. 
University of Arizona Graduate College Fellowship, 1998-1999.
Professional Development Grant, Arizona Commission on the Arts, Summer 2000.
Billy Waller Prize in Poetry, 1999.

Art Exhibitions
Mong-Lan's paintings and photographs have been exhibited for one year in the Capitol House in Washington D.C., for six months at the Dallas Museum of Art, the Museum of Fine Arts in Houston, in galleries in the San Francisco Bay Area, and in public exhibitions in Tokyo, Seoul, Bangkok, Buenos Aires, and Bali.  In conjunction with the National Endowment for the Arts, she was the Dallas Museum of Fine Arts' inaugural Visual Artist and Poet in Residence in 2005. An exhibition of her paintings and photographs, "The World of Mong-Lan," ran for six months. She has had shows of her artwork and tango drawings and paintings in numerous public exhibitions in the U.S.

Discography

 LAN Tango: La Voz de Mong-Lan, independent, 2013.
 LAN: Tango y Más, independent, 2014.
 Diary: Voyages, piano compositions & solos, 2015. 
 Visions: Diary, piano compositions & solos, 2015. 
 City of Dreams / Ciudad de Sueños, piano compositions & solos, 2015. 
 Equivalences / Synchronicities, piano compositions & solos, 2015. 
 Under 13 Moons, piano compositions & solos, 2015. 
 The Cosmic Blues ~ Dragonfly Dances, 2016. 
 Dreaming Orchid: Poetry & Jazz Piano, 2018.
 Perfumas de Amor: de Argentina y Viet Nam (Tango por Siempre), 2018.
 New Orleans of My Heart, 2019.
 Arrabal de Tango: Tango por Siempre, 2020.

References

External links
 Mong-Lan's Website (English)
 Mộng-Lan's website (Vietnamese) một nhà thơ Mỹ gốc Việt
 Mong-Lan Singer / Music
 Poem, "Three-Auricled Heart,"
 Poem, "Keel of Earth's Axis,"
 Poem, "Coyote,"
 Poem, "A Bamboo Knife,"
 Interview, University of Maryland University College
 UMASS Press Author Page
 Tupelo Press Author Page
 Piano Compositions-Music

21st-century American poets
American women poets
American writers of Vietnamese descent
American women painters
Vietnamese emigrants to the United States
People from Ho Chi Minh City
Living people
Year of birth missing (living people)
21st-century American women writers
Stegner Fellows
21st-century American women photographers
21st-century American photographers